Saludecio is a comune (municipality) in the Province of Rimini in the Italian region Emilia-Romagna, about  southeast of Bologna and about  southeast of Rimini. It borders the municipalities of Mondaino, Montefiore Conca, Montegridolfo, Morciano di Romagna, San Giovanni in Marignano, Tavoleto and Tavullia.

Main sights

Porta Marina, the fortified gate built by Sigismondo Pandolfo Malatesta.
Torre Civica ("Civic Tower").
Church of San Biagio, housing 17th-century paintings by Claudio Ridolfi, Guido Cagnacci and others, as well as the body of Saint Amato Ronconi.
Palazzo Albini.
Porta Montanara, another entrance gate.
Town Hall, built on the ruins of the old castle.
Castle of Cerreto, one of the most outstanding rural burgs in the Rimini territory.

References

Cities and towns in Emilia-Romagna